Ordinary Day may refer to:

Ordinary Day, an album by Jeff & Sheri Easter, 2000
"Ordinary Day" (Curiosity Killed the Cat song), 1987
"Ordinary Day" (Vanessa Carlton song), 2002
"Ordinary Day" (Dolores O'Riordan song), 2007
 "Ordinary Day" (Great Big Sea song), 1997
"Ordinary Day", a song by Nick Lachey
"Ordinary Day", a song by Judge Jules featuring Cara Dillon
"Ordinary Day", a song by Ace of Base from their album Da Capo
 "Ordinary Day", a song by Todrick Hall featuring Nick Rashad Burroughs from Forbidden